{{Infobox musical artist
| name            = Holly-Anne Hull
| image           =
| caption         =
| birth_date      = 
| origin          = Camberley, Surrey, England
| instrument      = Vocals
| genre           = Pop
| occupation      = Singer, performer
| years_active    = 2009–present
| label           =
| associated_acts = My Camp Rock, West End Kids, The voice
| website         = 
}}

Holly-Anne Hull (born 17 October 1994, in Camberley, Surrey, England) is a British singer and stage actress who is best known for playing Christine Daaé in The Phantom of the Opera in the West End, London. She also won the Disney Channel UK talent search My Camp Rock in April 2009 and is one third of British Country trio Remember Mondays who featured on ITVs The Voice UK.

Early life
At a school musical recital Hull had her first taste of performing at the age of 9 when she sang a solo from The Little Mermaid.

Hull then joined the Guildford School of Acting Saturday School and performed in two Christmas pantomimes at the Yvonne Arnaud Theatre in Guildford. She was then accepted into the National Youth Music Theatre where she performed at Elizabeth II's 80th Birthday celebrations at Windsor Castle in May 2006. With NYMT she also performed The Dreaming in Tonbridge, Kent.

 Singing career 
2009: My Camp Rock
 Early stages 
Hull auditioned for the Disney Channel UK talent search My Camp Rock in early 2009 by making a video of herself singing "This Is Me". She was chosen as one of the 8 finalists, to take part in an intensive 4-day Camp Rock style workshop. She sang "Listen", whilst the other finalists also sang songs of their choice in front of JK & Joel and Zoe Tyler in order for them to 'hear their voices'. For the Camp Jam, which aired on 17 April 2009 she was told to sing "Here I Am" and advanced to the Grand Final after being chosen to advance by the four judges, Zoe Tyler, Craig David, Martin Morales and Gary Lloyd.

 Final 
In the grand final, which was held on 24 April 2009 at the Riverside Studios, Hammersmith, she was told to sing This Is Me.  Shortly after Hull performed a viewer vote was held on the My Camp Rock website where from 6 to 6:20pm viewers could vote for who they want to win the show, receiving the highest number of votes, therefore was announced winner the following day during the results show. She was presented the trophy by Demi Lovato, who was in London during the weekend and also performed her single La La Land during the results show. After her victory, Hull spoke of winning the competition. She said "I can't believe that thousands of Disney Channel viewers voted me as the winner of My Camp Rock. Meeting Demi Lovato was the best experience ever and made the Camp Rock dream a reality. I can't wait to watch my very own music video on the channel. I've enjoyed every minute and feel incredibly fortunate.”

 Performances 
Below is a list of songs Hull performed on the show.

 Debut single 
As a prize for winning My Camp Rock, Hull was taken by limo to a recording studio to record her own version of the Camp Rock track This Is Me, as well as a music video. The music video features Hull singing into a microphone in front of a screen which shows clips of her time at My Camp Rock. The music video premiered on Disney Channel UK on 1 May 2009. It was available to watch on the Disney Channel UK website before its premiere. It can now be purchased and downloaded from iTunes. Hull performed the song at her school in a special concert assembly, which was shown in My Camp Rock: Holly's Story. A Disney TV crew filmed her concert and interviewed her friends at Licensed Victuallers' School, Ascot. She said "Performing in front of my friends and family was more nerve-racking than taking part in the competition! But I'm really proud of what I have achieved. "Coming back to school was a bit of a reality check but my friends have all been really supportive."

Post My Camp Rock
A new feature, called My Camp Rock: Holly's Story, was shown on Disney Channel on 21 August 2009. It features unseen footage and follows Hull's journey from her initial audition, through to the intensive four-day "Camp Rock" style training course, and final performance before being crowned the winner by Demi Lovato. It also features her experiences on recording her single and performing at her school in a special concert assembly.

It is said that Hull will record and release One Dream Away, the official song for the children's charity, Dreamflight later in 2009, according to her website. Singing with fellow West End Kid, Hannah El-Ayadi, Hull performed the song live for the first time in 25 years at a Dreamflight charity event on 20 June 2009 at Heathrow Airport. The charity sends young terminally ill children on "trips of a lifetime".

Hull performed at "West End Live 2009" in Leicester Square (Main Stage) on 21 June 2009. Hull performed with the West End Kids company, singing music from Seussical, in addition to music from The Producers, Avenue Q and Urinetown.

In August 2009 Hull won an American Idol Dream Ticket at the American Idol Experience attraction at Disney's Hollywood Studios at the Walt Disney World Resort. Hull sang "Reflection" from Mulan to win the prize. She won the prize, which she qualified to the auditions. Hull performed at the American Idol audition for the television show, but her audition was never televised.

Hull is a part of a band called 'Remember Monday' along with Lauren Byrne and Charlotte Steele. They have released 7 singles; Drive (October 19th 2018), Home To Me (October 7th 2019), Find My Way (October 14th 2019), Version Of You (September 25th 2020), Fat Bottomed Girls (July 2nd 2021), What I Know Now (August 20th 2021) and Nothing Nice to Say (November 25th 2022).  

Remember Monday has an upcoming EP, called Hysterical Woman which will be released on February 3, 2023.

Hull, Byrne and Steele have also previously released a EP, under the band name Houston. The EP is called Manuscripts and was released on March 1, 2018. 

Personal life
Hull grew up in Camberley, Surrey with her mother, father, brother Sam, dog Charlie and sister Lily, who told Hull to audition for My Camp Rock. She attended LVS Ascot before going onto Farnborough Sixth Form College. She currently lives with her fiancé Craig, and her two cavaliers Honey and Maple.

Hull has completed her training at the London School of Musical Theatre, and graduated in 2014, training alongside Tim Phelps, James Lloyd-Skinner, Amy Griffith, Joanne Bacon, Adam Scott Pringle and Kris Marc-Joseph.

Hull was also in some musicals. She understudied Cosette and Gavroche in the Dubai and West End Productions of Les Miserables. She was in the cast of Les Misérables: The Staged Concert at the Gielgud Theatre and Sondheim Theatre, West End and understudied Fantine, Cosette and Gavroche. She played the role of Christine Daaé on the UK tour of The Phantom of the Opera before it was closed due to the COVID-19 pandemic. She is now starring as Christine in the new production of The Phantom of the Opera'' at Her Majesty's Theatre.

Discography

Singles

References

External links 
 Official West End Kids website
 Performance of This Is Me at the My Camp Rock final at YouTube.com
 Announcement of winner of My Camp Rock & winning performance at YouTube.com
 Official music video for This Is Me at YouTube.com
 Performance of Here's Where I Stand at West End Kids at YouTube.com
 Official Holly-Anne Hull website

1994 births
Living people
People from Camberley
People educated at Licensed Victuallers' School
Alumni of the Guildford School of Acting
Musicians from Surrey
21st-century English women singers
21st-century English singers